These are the official results of the men's decathlon competition at the 2006 European Athletics Championships in Gothenburg, Sweden. The competition started on 10 August and ended a day later, on 11 August, in the main stadium during the 19th edition of the championships, the Stadium Ullevi.

Medalists

Schedule

10 August

11 August

Records

Results

See also
 2005 World Championships in Athletics – Men's decathlon
 2006 Hypo-Meeting
 2006 Decathlon Year Ranking
 2007 World Championships in Athletics – Men's decathlon

References
 Results
 Results
 Official results

Decathlon
Combined events at the European Athletics Championships